The Wabek Consolidated School, at 3825 64th Ave. NW in Mountrail County, North Dakota, near Plaza, North Dakota, was listed on the National Register of Historic Places in 2019.

The school is a unique two-room schoolhouse, assembled in 1917 by joining of two one-room schoolhouses which were moved to the site.  A bell-tower was inserted between them.

Saved from demolition 

On August 3, 2018, local resident Hunter Andes circulated a petition in Plaza Township, Mountrail County, to save the century-old structure from being razed. Fifty-two percent of the residents in the township signed the petition. Andes created a 501(c)3 charitable organization to raise funds for repairs.

References

School buildings on the National Register of Historic Places in North Dakota
National Register of Historic Places in Mountrail County, North Dakota
Education in Mountrail County, North Dakota
One-room schoolhouses in North Dakota
Relocated buildings and structures in North Dakota
1917 in education
1917 establishments in North Dakota